The electoral district of Murray Plains is an electoral district of the Victorian Legislative Assembly in Australia. It was created in the redistribution of electoral boundaries in 2013, and came into effect at the 2014 state election.

The district was created due to the abolition of the districts of Swan Hill and Rodney. It is centred on the Murray River cities of Swan Hill and Echuca, including the towns of Kerang, Lake Boga, Cohuna and Rochester. It covers the Swan Hill, Gannawarra, Loddon and Campaspe local government areas.

Murray Plains was contested in the 2014 election by the sitting National Party MP for the abolished district of Swan Hill, Peter Walsh, who retained the seat, and was re-elected in 2018.

Members

Election results

References

External links
 District profile from the Victorian Electoral Commission

Murray Plains, Electoral district of
2014 establishments in Australia
Shire of Gannawarra
Swan Hill
Shire of Loddon
Shire of Campaspe